Usman-Tashly (Uśman-Taşlı) is a rural locality (a selo) and the administrative centre of Usman-Tashlinsky Selsoviet, Yermekeyevsky District, Bashkortostan, Russia. The population was 541 as of 2010. There are 8 streets.

Geography 
Usman-Tashly is located 26 km north of Yermekeyevo (the district's administrative centre) by road. Aksakovo is the nearest rural locality.

References 

Rural localities in Yermekeyevsky District